Conus abbas, common name the abbas cone, is a species of sea snail, a marine gastropod mollusk in the family Conidae, the cone snails and their allies.

Like all species within the genus Conus, these snails are predatory and venomous. They are capable of "stinging" humans, therefore live ones should be handled carefully.

Description
The shell of this species is white, very finely reticulated with narrow orange-brown lines, with a broad central and often narrower upper and lower bands of darker color bearing occasional longitudinal chocolate stripes.

The shell is very similar to that of Conus textile, but the shell is smaller, the reticulations much smaller, the longitudinal streaks rarely 
apparent, and the dark bands of Conus abbas occupy about the same positions as the lightest markings of Conus textile.

Distribution

Distribution after Tryon (1884): East Africa, Ceylon, Philippines, New Caledonia.
Distribution after Conus Biodiversity website: from South India and Sri Lanka to Java and Bali in Indonesia.
 Madagascar

Ecology 
Like all species within the genus Conus, these snails are predatory and venomous. They are capable of "stinging" humans, therefore live ones should be handled carefully or not at all.

References
This article incorporates public domain text from the reference.

 Dautzenberg, Ph. (1929). Mollusques testacés marins de Madagascar. Faune des Colonies Francaises, Tome III
 Filmer R.M. (2001). A Catalogue of Nomenclature and Taxonomy in the Living Conidae 1758 - 1998. Backhuys Publishers, Leiden. 388pp.
 Tucker J.K. (2009). Recent cone species database. September 4, 2009 Edition
 Tucker J.K. & Tenorio M.J. (2009) Systematic classification of Recent and fossil conoidean gastropods. Hackenheim: Conchbooks. 296 pp
 Puillandre N., Duda T.F., Meyer C., Olivera B.M. & Bouchet P. (2015). One, four or 100 genera? A new classification of the cone snails. Journal of Molluscan Studies. 81: 1-23

External links
 The Conus Biodiversity website
 Cone Shells - Knights of the Sea
 

abbas
Gastropods described in 1792